Saunterer was an American Thoroughbred racehorse. Ridden by Tom Costello, he won the 1881 Preakness Stakes and Belmont Stakes.

Background

Saunterer was bred in Pennsylvania by Aristides Welch. His father was leading sire Leamington, and his dam was Lemonade, a daughter of leading sire Lexington. He was later sold to George L. Lorillard.

Racing Career

Pedigree

References

1878 racehorse births
Thoroughbred family 9-c
Racehorses bred in the United States
Racehorses trained in the United States
Preakness Stakes winners
Belmont Stakes winners